"Amiga 64" is a term used to incorrectly refer to one, or both, of the Commodore computers:

The Commodore 64
The Amiga